Clotilde (Rullaud) ([kloːtildəʼ ʁʏːlɔ]; born March 1, 1978, in Reims) is an artistic director, singer, vocalist, flutist, composer, filmmaker, producer and vocal coach.

Biography

Education 
Clotilde was immersed in the performing arts (music, theatre and dance) from early childhood. Aged five, she began studying flute and singing at the conservatoire, before going on to complete her studies in jazz and improvised music at IACP (Paris) and EDIM (Cachan). She also explored opera singing with the tenor Peterson Cowan.

Her musical identity developed through her travels (the Balkans, Ireland, Lebanon, the US) and through her studying of vocal techniques, inspired by Meredith Monk, fado, tango, Romani music, Turkish music, Persian music, Inuit throat singing and Bulgarian voices.

Career 
Clotilde has recorded three albums as a vocalist and flutist. She has also directed and produced a short film, and written and directed a multidisciplinary performance.

With a repertoire spanning jazz, free improvisation and folk music, her career as a musician has led her to perform in France, Germany, Australia, Burkina Faso, China, South Korea, Japan, Luxembourg, the Netherlands, Switzerland, Taiwan, the United Kingdom and the United States.
Since 2007, Clotilde has taught at Martina A. Catella's school, Les Glotte-Trotters, in Paris. She also runs workshops for the festival Les Suds in Arles and for the Ateliers d’ethnomusicologie (ADEM) in Geneva.

In 2002 and 2003, she conceived two live shows inspired by her travel diaries: Sur la route des Tziganes and Monsieur Jazz, both multidisciplinary pieces for seven performers, in which Clotilde sang and danced, as well as narrated.

In 2004, she started working with the guitar player, Hugo Lippi, with whom she recorded her first album, Live au 7 Lézards, three years later.

March 2008 saw the beginning of a new project called In Extremis, a bass-less quartet with Olivier Hutman (piano), Dano Haider (seven-string guitar) and Antoine Paganotti (drums). Their hybrid music takes the audience to a place where the greatest jazz standards rub shoulders with world music, original compositions and pop songs.

Since 2010, Clotilde has developed a collaboration with bandonéonist and composer Tristan Macé. Their first project was Le Diable à froid (2010), a trio with horn-player Albin Lebossé, revolving around the musical and literary styles of surrealism, Dadaism and tango.

Next came Tristan Macé's jazz opera Etrangement Bleu (2011). Their most recent project is Fleurs Invincibles – Invincible Flowers (2012), also involving Emmanuel Bex (piano/organ), Yann Cléry (flutes), Laurent Salzard (bass) and Gautier Garrigue (drums). This bilingual project is based on original compositions by Tristan Macé, and inspired by texts from American poets of the Beat Generation, and black French poets of the 40s and 50s.

In 2014, she started collaborating with the pianist Alexandre Saada. Together, they founded the group Madeleine & Salomon, a minimalist and delicate duo tackling a humanist and rebellious repertoire. Their first album, A Woman’s Journey, is a homage to American female protest singers.

In 2017, she moved to New York City to pursue a collaboration with the American pianist Chris McCarthy, which led to Pieces of a Song, a repertoire of dark and beautiful pieces based on the writings of Beat poet Diane di Prima.

In 2019, Clotilde took part in the Badara festival in Burkina-Faso, her first encounter with this country where she established multiple artistic collaborations. Each stay gave rise to new creations: the French-Burkinese quintet Sankolé, created in January 2020, the Burkinese-Swiss-French quartet KanFiguè, created in January 2021, and the French-Burkinese quartet Djafolo.

With music proving to be an insufficient medium for her fertile imagination, Clotilde continued her reflections on womanhood by presenting in 2021 XXY, an interdisciplinary play performed by five musicians and five dancers, accompanied with footage of her music and body in motion artmovie XXY [ɛks/ɛks/wʌɪ] (2018). Grégory Dargent was involved as composer and Mehdi Diouri and Céline Tringali as choreographers.

Artistic approach 
 Random synchronicities 
noun, neologism. Non-illustrative dialogue between two different artistic disciplines expressing themselves irrespectively of each other, yet simultaneously. Poetry of revealed things.Clotilde revisits the well-known accidental synchronisms of cinematographic creation that Cocteau had already transposed to live performance through Roland Petit, choreographer of the play Le Jeune Homme et la Mort. She creates the conditions for these "prepared accidents", working on the presence in the moment as momentum.

Through these polyphonic works, each artistic discipline plays its own score. Inspired by the same intention, but fully independent from each other in their creative journey, they raise each other to a vibration that they could not have reached separately, thus avoiding the pitfall of illustration. When these scores meet, accidental synchronicities arise that open up new ways of looking at things, laying the foundations for a possible symbolic revolution.

Works

As project leader, artistic director and multidisciplinary artist 

 2021 - XXY, polyphonic poetry with 5 musicians, 5 dancers and 1 film. Filmmaker, artistic director, singer, flutist, with Grégory Dargent as composer and Mehdi Diouri and Céline Tringali as choreographers.
 2018 - XXY [ɛks/ɛks/wʌɪ], a film combining dance, music, singing and visual arts. Filmmaker, producer, editor, co-composer, arranger, flutist and vocalist alongside 30 artists: composers, musicians, dancers.
 2011 - In Extremis, compositions and covers album. Vocalist, flutist, writer-composer with Olivier Hutman (piano), Dano Haider (seven-string guitar) and Antoine Paganotti (drums).
 2007 - Live aux 7 Lézards, pop and jazz cover album. Singer in a duo with the guitarist Hugo Lippi.
 2003 - Monsieur Jazz, multidisciplinary performance. Singer, dancer, narrator and co-writer with Sophie Alour (saxophone and flute), Jean-Baptiste Laya (guitar and co-writer), Jean-Daniel Botta (double bass), Franck Filosa (drums) and Abderr (dance).
 2002 - Sur la route des Tziganes, multidisciplinary performance. Singer, dancer, storyteller and co-writer with Jean-Baptiste Laya (guitar and co-writer), the musicians of the company O’Djila and the dancer Valentina Casula.

As co-lead artist 

 2022 - Eastern Spring, a tribute to the oriental and militant pop of the 1960s-1970s. Singer of the duo Madeleine & Salomon with the pianist Alexandre Saada.
 2022 - 2019 - Pieces of a Song, original compositions, based on the writings of Diane di Prima, poetess of the Beat Generation. Vocalist, flutist, writer, and co-composer in a duo with the New-York pianist Chris McCarthy.
 2016 - A Woman’s Journey, homage to American female "protest singers". Singer in the duo Madeleine & Salomon co-founded with the pianist Alexandre Saada.
 2014 - Lofi Improvisation. Free Jazz. Vocalist and co-composer in a duo with the American drummer and percussionist Percival Roman.
 2013 - Fleurs Invincibles – Invincible Flowers, texts by American poets of the Beat Generation and French black poets of the 40s-50s set to original music by Tristan Macé. Vocalist with Emmanuel Bex (piano), Yann Cléry (flute), Laurent Salzard (electric and acoustic bass), Gautier Garrigue (drums) and Tristan Macé.
 2012 - Le diable a froid. Contemporary jazz trio inspired by Dada music. Vocalist with Albin Lebossé (horn) and Tristan Macé (bandoneon and composition).

As guest artist 

 2022 - Tribute to Radiohead vol.3, Amnesiac Quartet of Sébastien Paindestre (pianist), singer and flutist with Bruno Schorp (double bass) and Antoine Paganotti (drums, voice)
 2013 - La complainte de la Tour Eiffel by Nicolas Rageau (double bass), singer with Alain Jean-Marie (piano) and Philippe Soirat (drums)
 2011 - Bestiaire by Philippe Crab 
 2009 - Papillons de Paris by Jean-Daniel Botta
 2009 - Contretemps by Léonore Boulanger
 2007 - La flemme parisienne by Léonore Boulanger

Awards and critics

Eastern Spring 

 TTTT, Télérama 
 4 stars, Jazzmagazine 
 INDISPENSABLE, Jazz News
 ÉLU, Citizen Jazz 

The clip Ma Fatsh Leah, from the album Eastern Spring, has been selected :

 Short film "coup de coeur" at the Carrefour du Cinéma d'Animation 2022

XXY [ɛks/ɛks/wʌɪ] 

 5 awards and nominations:    
 Best Cinematography at the Shetown Festival in Detroit,
 Best Emerging Vision at the Arts Triangle Festival in Dallas, 
 Best Music Video at the Paris Short Film Festival, 
 Nomination for the Audience Award at the Athens Video Dance Project 
 Nomination for the Best Experimental Short at Berlin Motion Picture Festival
 Selections in over thirty festivals around the world including Interfilm in Berlin, San Francisco Dance Film Festival, Cine.Dans.Fest, Festival Européen du Film Court, Berlin Feminist Film Week, Nuit Blanche à Paris and Shorts Attack Festival

A woman’s Journey 

 4 stars in All About Jazz (USA) and Fono Forum (DE)
 Ranked in the Top 25 albums of February 2018 by KALX 90.7FM Berkeley radio (USA) 
 Ranked in the Top 5 albums of January 2018 by Paul Glaser on WLFR 91.7 FM (USA)
 Ranked in the Top 10 albums of January 2018 by Erin Wolf on WMSE 91.7 FM (USA)
 Ranked in the Best albums of 2017 by Hobart Taylor on KUCI 88.9FM (USA)
 Best Album of 2016 by Nathalie Piolé and Alex Duthil, France Musique
 Best Album of 2016 by Jazzmagazine and CitizenJazz
 Disc of the week, FIP
 TTT, Télérama sortir
 CHOC, Jazzmagazine
 INDISPENSABLE, Jazznews
 ELU, Citizenjazz
 «Oui on aime», Culturejazz
 Sélection Jazz, Libération
 Album Jazz de l’été, Les InRocks

In Extremis 

 Ranked in the Top 5 albums of the NPR Annual Jazz Critics Poll: 2013
 Ranked in the Top 5 albums of 2011 - SundayTimes
 Among the best 10 Jazz albums 2011 of Citizenjazz.com
 "Pick of the week" on Fip show on France Musique June 2011
 TT, Télérama

Live au 7 Lézards 

 ***, Jazzman

References

Sources
Notice d’autorité: Bibliothèque Nationale de France - In Extremis
 Notice d’autorité: Bibliothèque Nationale de France - Live au 7 Lézards
Ressource relative à l'audiovisuel: (en) Internet Movie Database

External links 
iTunes
Amazon 
clotilde.art Site officiel

1978 births
Living people
French jazz singers
French composers
Mass media people from Reims
French singer-songwriters
Musicians from Reims